Chemchem is an administrative ward in Kondoa District, Dodoma Region, Tanzania. According to the 2012 census, the ward has a total population of 7914

References

Kondoa District
Wards of Dodoma Region